Smith Mills is a census-designated place (CDP) in the town of Dartmouth in Bristol County, Massachusetts, United States. The population was 4,760 at the 2010 census.

Geography
Smith Mills is located at  (41.639807, -70.984491).

According to the United States Census Bureau, the CDP has a total area of 12.4 km (4.8 mi). 12.3 km (4.7 mi) of it is land and 0.2 km (0.1 mi) of it (1.46%) is water.

Demographics

As of the census of 2000, there were 4,432 people, 1,861 households, and 1,269 families residing in the CDP. The population density was 361.8/km (936.9/mi). There were 1,931 housing units at an average density of 157.6/km (408.2/mi). The racial makeup of the CDP was 95.62% White, 0.27% African American, 0.27% Native American, 1.06% Asian, 0.05% Pacific Islander, 1.31% from other races, and 1.42% from two or more races. Hispanic or Latino of any race were 1.33% of the population.

There were 1,861 households, out of which 27.2% had children under the age of 18 living with them, 49.9% were married couples living together, 15.3% had a female householder with no husband present, and 31.8% were non-families. 27.4% of all households were made up of individuals, and 16.7% had someone living alone who was 65 years of age or older. The average household size was 2.37 and the average family size was 2.87.

In the CDP, the population was spread out, with 21.0% under the age of 18, 7.4% from 18 to 24, 24.3% from 25 to 44, 25.2% from 45 to 64, and 22.1% who were 65 years of age or older. The median age was 43 years. For every 100 females, there were 85.3 males. For every 100 females age 18 and over, there were 79.5 males.

The median income for a household in the CDP was $41,272, and the median income for a family was $50,558. Males had a median income of $40,558 versus $25,788 for females. The per capita income for the CDP was $20,820. About 6.6% of families and 6.4% of the population were below the poverty line, including 7.9% of those under age 18 and 3.3% of those age 65 or over.

References

Census-designated places in Bristol County, Massachusetts
Providence metropolitan area
Census-designated places in Massachusetts